The 1907 South Australian Football League season was the 31st season of the top-level Australian rules football competition in South Australia and the first season under a new name.

 won their 14 SAFL premiership and a second Championship of Australia against .

Ladder

References 

SAFA
South Australian National Football League seasons